Husqvarna Vapenfabriks Aktiebolag or simply HVA) was a Swedish firearms manufacturing company in the town of Huskvarna by lake Vättern.

History

In 1689 the manager at the nearby state arsenal in Jönköping, Erik Dahlbergh, suggested to the King that the crown should support the construction of a new milling work at the waterfalls just outside Huskvarna. The new work should act as a branch of the Jönköping arsenal, where water supply had become irregular. The plans were approved and put into work the same year. Thanks to the Husqvarna branch, the annual production of barrels for muskets from the Jönköping arsenal increased from about 1,500 to over 12,000.

Eventually all production was moved to Huskvarna and in 1757 the arsenal was privatized under the ownership of Fredrik Ehrenpreus. In 1867 the company became a limited company under the name Husqvarna Vapenfabriks Aktiebolag.

When military orders dropped after the Danish-Prussian War of 1864 and the Franco-Prussian War of 1870-71, Husqvarna begun making shotguns and hunting rifles. They also started manufacturing stoves, sewing machines and bicycles. In 1903 Husqvarna made their first motorcycle. Husqvarna continued firearms production, though mostly civilian firearms except during the two world wars and some shorter periods of military production.

In the late 1960s it was decided that Husqvarna should stop making break-action firearms and sell both the rifle production and military contracts to Carl Gustafs Stads Gevärsfaktori in Eskilstuna.

In 1987, Husqvarna sold the motorcycle division to Italian motorcycle manufacturer Cagiva.

Military firearms
Gevär modell 1867
Pistol m/07
Pistol m/40
Kulsprutepistol m/37
Kulsprutepistol m/39
Gevär (Mauser rifle) m/38, m/96
Automatkarbin 4
Maskinpistol M/49 (for the Danish Army)

Civilian firearms
Husqvarna made numerous types and models of break action shotguns.

The first medium caliber bolt-action rifles used the same action as the Swedish Army's Mauser m/96. This type was manufactured from 1927 to 1942 circa, known as the Model 46 and mostly chambered in 6.5×55mm, 9.3×57mm and 9.3×62mm
from early 1939 Husqvarna started purchasing Mauser M98 actions from the Belgian company FN, labeling the rifles Model 146, 246 and 640. Though the M98 was a strong and well proven action, it was not an ideal situation for Husqvarna to be depending on one of its worst competitors for such a key component.

An independent bolt action design was introduced in 1953 as the 1600-series, which was available in several European and American chamberings, including 9.3×62mm, .270, 30-06; 8×57mm, 6.5×55mm, and others. It was a small ring Mauser-like design advertised as the "HVA Improved Mauser Action". In 1969 they discontinued the HVA action in favor of a cheaper to produce push feed design, called the 8000. They ceased manufacturing all firearms in 1972.

With the army order for the Ak 4 the company was able to find the funding to re-tool the workshop to produce a newly developed bolt action, marketed in 1967 as the 1900-series and continued by Förenade Fabriksverken (FFV) well into the 1980s.

Husqvarna also built a limited number of an elegant double rifle in caliber 9.3x74R, the model 410.

See also
Husqvarna Group
Husqvarna Motorcycles

Defunct companies of Sweden
Firearm manufacturers of Sweden
Industrial history of Sweden

sv:Husqvarna#Vapen